Vincent Lam (born September 5, 1974) is a Canadian writer and medical doctor.

Early life and education
Born in London, Ontario and raised in Ottawa, Lam's parents came to Canada from the Chinese expatriate community in Vietnam. He attended St. Pius X High School and did his medical training at the University of Toronto, graduating in 1999.

Career
Lam worked as an emergency physician at Toronto East General Hospital and has done international air evacuation work and expedition medicine on Arctic and Antarctic ships. He is currently working as an addictions physician at Coderix Medical Clinic.

Writing career
Lam's first book Bloodletting and Miraculous Cures is based on his experiences in medical school. Bloodletting and Miraculous Cures won the 2006 Scotiabank Giller Prize, Canada's most prestigious literary award, on November 7, 2006. Bloodletting and Miraculous Cures was also a finalist for The Story Prize in 2008. His second book, the Flu Pandemic and You, which was co-authored by Colin Lee, was published in 2008.

Following Lam's Giller win, Shaftesbury Films announced that it had reached a deal to adapt Bloodletting into a television series, which debuted in January 2010 on HBO Canada.

Lam published a biography of Canadian politician Tommy Douglas, as part of Penguin Canada's Extraordinary Canadians series of historical biographies.

His first novel, The Headmaster's Wager, was published in 2012 by Doubleday Canada and has been shortlisted for the 2012 Governor General's Literary Award.

Personal life
Lam currently lives with his wife and three children in Toronto.

Bibliography
The Flu Pandemic and You, co-written with Colin Lee with a foreword by Margaret Atwood  (2006)
Bloodletting and Miraculous Cures (2006)
Extraordinary Canadians: Tommy Douglas (2011)
The Headmaster's Wager (2012)

References

External links
 

1974 births
Canadian medical writers
Canadian male novelists
Canadian emergency physicians
Canadian male short story writers
Canadian biographers
Male biographers
Canadian people of Chinese descent
Canadian people of Vietnamese descent
Living people
Writers from London, Ontario
Writers from Ottawa
Writers from Toronto
University of Toronto alumni
Canadian writers of Asian descent
21st-century Canadian novelists
21st-century biographers
21st-century Canadian short story writers
21st-century Canadian male writers
Canadian male non-fiction writers